The Old Union School is a historic school building at 504 Old Union Road in Birdell, Arkansas.  It is a single-story wood frame Plain Traditional structure, with a corrugated metal gable roof and a stone foundation.  Built in 1913, it is one of the few older structures in Birdell, and the only one-room schoolhouse in southwestern Randolph County.  The building was used as a school until 1941, and saw only occasional use for other community purposes until 1991, when it underwent a major restoration.  It is now used as a community hall.

The building was listed on the National Register of Historic Places in 1993.

See also
National Register of Historic Places listings in Randolph County, Arkansas

References

School buildings on the National Register of Historic Places in Arkansas
One-room schoolhouses in Arkansas
Buildings and structures in Randolph County, Arkansas
National Register of Historic Places in Randolph County, Arkansas